William G. Connolly, is a co-author of The New York Times style guide and a member of the executive committee of the American Copy Editors Society.

Education 
Born in Scranton, Pennsylvania, Connolly attended St. Paul's School. He graduated from the Scranton Preparatory School in 1955 and the University of Scranton in 1959. Following his service in the U.S. Army (1959-1962), in 1963 he earned a master's degree from the Graduate School of Journalism at Columbia University.

Career
Connolly is a retired newspaper editor and former copy editor who spent most of his career at The New York Times. He joined the New York Times in 1966, working as a copy editor on the foreign news desk. He later served as copy editor on the New York Times Magazine and assistant real estate editor. In 1975, he joined the national news staff.

He retired in 2001. He has also been active in promoting racial and ethnic diversity in journalism and supporting student journalism and mentoring. He is currently a director for the Education Fund where he was also its former president. Throughout his career, he has lectured a number of times at the American Press Institute. From 1981 - 2001, he taught courses at the Maynard Institute's editing program, University of Arizona, and the University of California, Berkeley.

Before working for The Times, Connolly worked for The Minneapolis Tribune, The Houston Chronicle, and The Detroit Free Press as a reporter and editor. He was the managing editor of The Virginian-Pilot from 1979 - 1983.

Since being retired, he is pursuing a lifelong interest in attending art school.

Works
Connolly also wrote The New York Times Guide to Buying or Building a Home. From 1987 - 1989, he wrote "Winners & Sinners," a critique of a paper that was read by journalists, writers, and educators.

References

External links 
 http://www.copydesk.org/election/10elex/connolly.php
 http://www.ajr.org/Article.asp?id=3139

American copy editors
The New York Times editors
Living people
Year of birth missing (living people)
Writers of style guides
Detroit Free Press people
Houston Chronicle people
University of Scranton alumni